A roller disco is a discothèque or skating rink where all the dancers wear roller skates of some kind (traditional quad or inline). The music played is modern and easily danceable, historically disco but in modern times including almost any form of dance, pop or rock music.

History
The concept originated as a fad in the 1970s when the disco craze was at its height, peaking around 1980 and inspiring several roller-disco magazines. In 1984 the fad arrived in the United Kingdom and many roller discos popped up all over the country  , the craze has largely discontinued, although many 1970s era roller-discos are still open and successful. Also, it experienced a mild revival in the early 2000s, especially in the mid-eastern United States, where certain clubs continue to host roller disco nights. Some now use in-line roller-blades. Roller discos are also popular among older children and young teenagers, especially for parties. As in other discos, special effects such as fog machines and flashing traffic lights are often used.  To minimise the  risk of injury, the organisers of roller discos often only allow participants to skate in one direction at a time, so that they do not crash into one another, although many roller discos have a "free skate" section in the middle of the roller rink.

In 2020, roller skating and roller discos experienced a resurgence in mainstream popularity across the Western world. The resurgence in popularity for roller skating and roller discos has coincided with a disco revival and a resurgence in other retro phenomena in 2020. Some companies selling roller skates in the US were reported to have sold out of roller skates due to high demand. The resurgence has been powered by social media apps like Instagram, TikTok and Snapchat which have seen an increase of roller skating-related content. In Hobart, Australia, it was reported that the popularity of roller skating was at its highest since the 1980s. The media has suggested the resurgence in roller skating may be the result of people finding ways to entertain themselves and a form of escape as a result of the COVID-19 pandemic which has resulted in widespread lockdowns, curfews and restrictions across the world.

In popular culture

Film
 Roller Boogie (1979), a film about roller disco
 Skatetown, U.S.A. (1979) is set in a fictional Los Angeles area roller disco
 La Boum (1980) the main character Vic Sophie Marceau sneaks out to go to a roller disco called La main jaune
 Xanadu (1980), American film
 Get Rollin' (1980), American documentary 
 Austin Powers in Goldmember (2002) gives Goldmember a roller disco in 1975
 Van Wilder (2002), the main character Van Wilder throws a roller disco party
 Roll Bounce (2005) has a roller disco competition in the plot
 ATL (2006)

Television
"Angels on Skates", episode of Charlie's Angels
 Season 1 episode 2 of The Goldbergs
 In "The Einstein Approximation", episode of The Big Bang Theory, several of the characters go to a roller disco.
 In a flashback episode of The Fairly OddParents, Denzel Crocker's mom mentions she worked at a roller disco in the early '70s
 In "Hell Comes to Quahog", a 2006 episode of Family Guy, Peter Griffin and his friends Cleveland Brown, Joe Swanson, and Glenn Quagmire dance to "A Fifth of Beethoven" by Walter Murphy.
 In an episode of Malcolm In The Middle, we learn that Malcolm's father, Hal, was once a local roller disco champion.
 Season 5 episode 3 of Rentaghost
 In "Roller Disco", an episode of That '70s Show, Jackie Burkhart and Fez take part in a roller disco competition. Four years later, in an episode called "Angie", it is revealed the leading character, Eric Forman, is a closeted roller disco dancer.
 In the "Diamond Jack" episode of Three's Company, Jack attends the Venice Roller Rink, where he meets his blind date named Rita.
 In The Young Ones series 1, episode 2 ("Oil"), Mike converts Rick's room into a roller disco
 In CHiPs season 3, episodes 1 and 2, roller disco is the central theme.
 In Muteking, The Dashing Warrior, Muteking, the protagonist, practice the Roller Disco.

See also
Jam skating

References

Disco
1970s fads and trends
1980s fads and trends
2020s fads and trends